Sound-Dust is the seventh studio album by English-French rock band Stereolab. It was released on 28 August 2001 in North America by Elektra Records and on 3 September 2001 internationally by Duophonic Records. The album was produced by John McEntire and Jim O'Rourke and recorded at McEntire's Chicago studio Soma. It was Stereolab's last album to feature singer and guitarist Mary Hansen, who died in a biking accident the following year.

The first 1,200 copies of both the CD and LP issues of Sound-Dust were packaged with a handmade book sleeve. A remastered and expanded edition of the album was released by Duophonic and Warp on 29 November 2019.

The song "Nothing to Do with Me" features lyrics derived from English satirist Chris Morris' TV series Jam.

Track listing

Personnel
Credits are adapted from the album's liner notes.

Stereolab
 Tim Gane – acoustic and electric guitars, piano, Pianet, Rhodes, Rock-Si-Chord, and Wurlitzer pianos, clavinet, electric harpsichord, Farfisa organ, celesta, electronics, tape echo and delay
 Lætitia Sadier – vocals, percussion, whistling, sound effects
 Mary Hansen – vocals, percussion, whistling, sound effects
 Simon Johns – six-string bass
 Andy Ramsay – drums

Additional musicians

 Tim Barnes – bongo drum on "Gus the Mynahbird"
 Jeb Bishop – trombone
 Dave Max Crawford – trumpet
 Mikael Jorgensen – electric harpsichord, Rhodes piano
 Glenn Kotche – crotales on "Captain Easychord" and "Gus the Mynahbird", marimba on "Gus the Mynahbird"
 Rob Mazurek – cornet on "Captain Easychord" and "Gus the Mynahbird"
 John McEntire – piano, Pianet, Rhodes, Rock-Si-Chord, and Wurlitzer pianos, clavinet, electric harpsichord, Farfisa organ, celesta, vibraphone, marimba, glockenspiel, electronics, tape echo and delay, percussion, whistling, sound effects
 Paul Mertens – flute, bass harmonica
 Sean O'Hagan – acoustic and electric guitars, piano, Pianet, Rhodes, Rock-Si-Chord, and Wurlitzer pianos, clavinet, electric harpsichord, Farfisa organ, celesta, brass and flute arrangements
 Jim O'Rourke – acoustic and electric guitars, piano, Pianet, Rhodes, Rock-Si-Chord, and Wurlitzer pianos, clavinet, electric harpsichord, Farfisa organ, celesta, vibraphone, marimba, glockenspiel, electronics, tape echo and delay
 Andy Robinson – brass and flute arrangements
 Chad Taylor – cymbals on "The Black Arts", drums on "Nothing to Do with Me"

Production

 Mike Jorgensen – computer assistance
 Jeremy Lemos – additional engineering
 John McEntire – engineering, mixing
 Jim O'Rourke – engineering, mixing
 Steve Rooke – mastering
 Stereolab (credited as "The Groop") – mixing

Design
 House – design

Charts

References

External links
 Sound-Dust at official Stereolab website
 
 

2001 albums
Stereolab albums
Albums produced by John McEntire
Albums produced by Jim O'Rourke (musician)
Elektra Records albums